Terry Walter Harmon (born April 12, 1944) is an American former professional baseball second baseman/shortstop who played Major League Baseball (MLB) for the Philadelphia Phillies (1967, 1969–77). He was a 5th round pick (85th player chosen overall) of the Phillies in the 1965 MLB Draft.

Harmon attended DeVilbiss High School and Ohio University.

 Harmon helped the Phillies win two consecutive National League (NL) Eastern Division titles, in 1976 and 1977.

Over ten MLB seasons, Harmon played in 547 games, had 1,125 at-bats, 164 runs scored, 262 hits, 31 doubles, 12 triples, 4 home runs, 72 RBIs, 17 stolen bases, and 117 walks, with a .233 batting average, .311 on-base percentage, and .292 slugging percentage.

After Harmon's baseball career ended, he became involved in cable TV, first with PRISM (the Philadelphia sports channel), then with home shopping, including a cable television 24/7 jewelry channel.

See also
List of Major League Baseball players who spent their entire career with one franchise

References

External links

Terry Harmon at Baseball Almanac
Terry Harmon at Baseball Gauge

1944 births
Living people
Major League Baseball second basemen
Major League Baseball shortstops
Philadelphia Phillies players
Baseball players from Ohio
Ohio Bobcats baseball players
Sportspeople from Toledo, Ohio
Buffalo Bisons (minor league) players
Tidewater Tides players
Bakersfield Bears players